Basirhat Uttar Assembly constituency is an assembly constituency in North 24 Parganas district in the Indian state of West Bengal.

Overview
As per orders of the Delimitation Commission, 125 Basirhat Uttar Assembly constituency is composed of the following: Basirhat II community development block, and Amlani, Bhebia, Makhal Gachha, Murarisha gram panchayats of Hasnabad community development block.

Basirhat Uttar Assembly constituency is part of 18. Basirhat (Lok Sabha constituency).

Members of Legislative Assembly

Election results

2016

The percentage changes of the 2016 election is calculated based upon the 2011 Bypoll.

2011
A by-election in 2011 was necessitated by the death of Mostafa  bin Kassem, the CPI(M) MLA from Basirhat Uttar, who was found dead outside Kyd street MLA's Hostel on 29 May 2011.

 

The percentage changes of the Bypoll is calculated from the 2011 assembly election.

As per 2011 census the total population of basirhat uttar is 338937,Hindu 115986,Muslim 222264,Other 687.Hindu 34.22%,Muslim 65.58%,Other 0.20%.

1977-2006 Basirhat
During the period Narayan Mukherjee of CPI(M) won seven elections in a row from 95 Basirhat assembly constituency, defeating his nearest rivals Asit Majumdar of INC in 2006, Souren Sen of Trinamool Congress in 2001, Asit Majumdar of Congress in 1996, Dilip Mazumdar of Congress in 1991 and 1987, and Debi Prasad Nanda of Congress in 1982 and 1977.

1951-1972 Basirhat
Contests in most years were multi cornered but only winners and runners are being mentioned. Lalit Kumar Ghosh of Congress won in 1972 and 1971. A.B.Bandopadhyay of CPI won in 1969 and 1967. Bijesh Chandra Sen of Congress won in 1962. Profulla Nath Banerjee of Congress won in 1957 and in independent India's first election in 1951.

References

Assembly constituencies of West Bengal
Politics of North 24 Parganas district
Basirhat